Oroperipatus koepckei is a species of velvet worm in the Peripatidae family. The original description of this species is based on a single female specimen measuring 40 mm in length. The female of this species has 32 pairs of legs. The type locality is in Peru.

References

Onychophorans of tropical America
Onychophoran species
Animals described in 1954